Coriolis may refer to:
 Gaspard-Gustave de Coriolis (1792–1843), French mathematician, mechanical engineer and scientist
 Coriolis force, the apparent deflection of moving objects from a straight path when viewed from a rotating frame of reference
 Coriolis (crater), a lunar crater
 Coriolis (project), a French operational oceanographic project
 Coriolis (satellite), an American Earth and space observation satellite launched in 2003